Events in the year 1846 in Norway.

Incumbents
Monarch: Oscar I

Events

Arts and literature

Births
22 February – Peder Nilsen, politician and Minister (d.1921)
4 August – Stephan Sinding, sculptor (d.1922)
5 August – Alvilde Prydz, Norwegian novelist (d.1922 in Norway)
22 August – Amalie Skram, author and feminist (d.1905)
30 September – Oscar Ambrosius Castberg, painter and sculptor (d.1917)
22 October – Anders Andersen, politician (d.1931)
10 December – Gregers Winther Wulfsberg Gram, jurist and politician (d.1929)
15 December – Kittel Halvorson, a U.S. Representative from Minnesota (d.1936)

Full date unknown
Hans Konrad Foosnæs, politician and Minister (d.1917)
Axel Otto Kristian Hagemann, politician

Deaths
28 April – Christen Smed, blacksmith and mountaineer (b.1797)

See also